Brian Ryckeman (born 13 July 1984) is a Belgian professional swimmer, specialising in Open water swimming. He competed at the 2008 and 2012 Summer Olympics.

References

Belgian male long-distance swimmers
1984 births
Living people
Olympic swimmers of Belgium
Swimmers at the 2008 Summer Olympics
Swimmers at the 2012 Summer Olympics
World Aquatics Championships medalists in open water swimming